Bargam, or Mugil, is a Papuan language of Sumgilbar Rural LLG, Madang Province, Papua New Guinea, spoken mainly by adults. It is divergent within the Madang language family.

The alphabet includes the letter Q with hook tail, Ɋ ɋ.

References

External links
Bargam Grammar Sketch

Madang languages
Languages of Madang Province